In chemistry, a trigonal pyramid is a molecular geometry with one atom at the apex and three atoms at the corners of a trigonal base, resembling a tetrahedron (not to be confused with the tetrahedral geometry). When all three atoms at the corners are identical, the molecule belongs to point group C3v. Some molecules and ions with trigonal pyramidal geometry are the pnictogen hydrides (XH3), xenon trioxide (XeO3), the chlorate ion, and the sulfite ion, . In organic chemistry, molecules which have a trigonal pyramidal geometry are sometimes described as sp3 hybridized. The AXE method for VSEPR theory states that the classification is AX3E1.

Trigonal pyramidal geometry in ammonia 

The nitrogen in ammonia has 5 valence electrons and bonds with three hydrogen atoms to complete the octet. This would result in the geometry of a regular tetrahedron with each bond angle equal to cos−1(−) ≈ 109.5°. However, the three hydrogen atoms are repelled by the electron lone pair in a way that the geometry is distorted to a trigonal pyramid (regular 3-sided pyramid) with bond angles of 107°. In contrast, boron trifluoride is flat, adopting a trigonal planar geometry because the boron does not have a lone pair of electrons. In ammonia the trigonal pyramid undergoes rapid nitrogen inversion.

See also
VSEPR theory#AXE method
Molecular geometry

References

External links
Chem| Chemistry, Structures, and 3D Molecules 
Indiana University Molecular Structure Center
 Interactive molecular examples for point groups
Molecular Modeling
Animated Trigonal Planar Visual

Stereochemistry
Molecular geometry